Mälarhöjden is a suburb in south-west Stockholm, Sweden. It is a part of Hägersten borough. The area is dominated by single-family houses. It borders Hägersten, Västertorp, Fruängen and Bredäng. As of 2004, the area had 4022 inhabitants.

Sources
 Bo G. Hall: Mälarhöjden med omnejd - Från Örnsberg till Vårberg, Monographies published by City of Stockholm, No 72, 1986, 

Districts of Stockholm